Alyaksandr Sobal (born 8 December 1982) is a Belarusian former professional footballer. He retired from professional football in early 2010 at the age of 27 due to persistent injuries. In 2012, he came out of retirement and joined a third-level club Osipovichi. In 2014, he played for Kletsk.

Honours
Shakhtyor Soligorsk
Belarusian Premier League champion: 2005

References

External links
Profile at teams.by

1982 births
Living people
Belarusian footballers
Association football defenders
Belarusian expatriate footballers
Expatriate footballers in Lithuania
FC Darida Minsk Raion players
FC Torpedo Minsk players
FC Shakhtyor Soligorsk players
FK Sūduva Marijampolė players
FC Minsk players
FC Osipovichi players
FC Luch Minsk (2012) players
FC Kletsk players